A motor vehicle, also known as motorized vehicle or automotive vehicle, is a self-propelled land vehicle, commonly wheeled, that does not operate on rails (such as trains or trams) and is used for the transportation of people or cargo.

The vehicle propulsion is provided by an engine or motor, usually an internal combustion engine or an electric motor, or some combination of the two, such as hybrid electric vehicles and plug-in hybrids. For legal purpose, motor vehicles are often identified within a number of vehicle classes including cars, buses, motorcycles, off-road vehicles, light trucks and regular trucks. These classifications vary according to the legal codes of each country.  ISO 3833:1977 is the standard for road vehicle types, terms and definitions. Generally, to avoid requiring people with disabilities from having to possess an operator's license to use one, or requiring tags and insurance, powered wheelchairs will be specifically excluded by law from being considered motor vehicles.

, there were more than one billion motor vehicles in use in the world, excluding off-road vehicles and heavy construction equipment. The US publisher Ward's estimates that as of 2019, there were 1.4 billion motor vehicles in use in the world.

Global vehicle ownership per capita in 2010 was 148 vehicles in operation (VIO) per 1000 people. China has the largest motor vehicle fleet in the world, with 322 million motor vehicles registered at the end of September 2018. The United States has the highest vehicle ownership per capita in the world, with 832 vehicles in operation per 1000 people in 2016. Also, China became the world's largest new car market in 2009. In 2011, a total of 80 million cars and commercial vehicles were built, led by China which built a total of 18.5 million motor vehicles.

Definitions and terminology

In 1968 the Vienna Convention on Road Traffic gave one of the first international definitions of a motor vehicle:

Other sources might provide other definitions, for instance in the year 1977, ISO 3833:1977 provide other definitions.

Ownership trends

The US publisher Ward's estimates that as of 2010, there were 1.015 billion motor vehicles in use in the world. This figure represents the number of cars, trucks (light, medium and heavy duty), and buses, but does not include off-road vehicles or heavy construction equipment. The world vehicle population passed the 500 million-unit mark in 1986, from 250 million motor vehicles in 1970. Between 1950 and 1970, the vehicle population doubled roughly every 10 years.  Navigant Consulting forecasts that the global stock of light-duty motor vehicles will reach 2 billion units in 2035.

Global vehicle ownership in 2010 was 148 vehicles in operation per 1000 people, a ratio of 1:6.75 vehicles to people, slightly down from 150 vehicles per 1000 people in 2009, a rate of 1:6.63 vehicles to people. The global rate of motorization increased in 2013 to 174 vehicles per 1000 people. In developing countries vehicle ownership rates rarely exceed 200 cars per 1,000 population.

The following table summarizes the evolution of motor vehicle registrations in the world from 1960 to 2019:

Alternative fuels and vehicle technology adoption

Since the early 2000s, the number of alternative fuel vehicles has been increasing driven by the interest of several governments to promote their widespread adoption through public subsidies and other non-financial incentives. Governments have adopted these policies due to a combination of factors, such as environmental concerns, high oil prices, and less dependence on imported oil.

Among the fuels other than traditional petroleum fuels (gasoline or diesel fuel), and alternative technologies for powering the engine of a motor vehicle, the most popular options promoted by different governments are: natural gas vehicles,  LPG powered vehicles, flex-fuel vehicles, use of biofuels, hybrid electric vehicles, plug-in hybrids, electric cars, and hydrogen fuel cell cars.

Since the late 2000s, China, European countries, the United States, Canada, Japan and other developed countries have been providing strong financial incentives to promote the adoption of plug-in electric vehicle. , the stock of light-duty plug-in vehicles in use totaled over 10 million units. , in addition, the medium and heavy commercial segments add another 700,000 units to the global stock of plug-in electric vehicles. In 2020 the global market share of plug-in passenger car sales was 4.2%, up from 2.5% in 2019. Nevertheless, despite government support and the rapid growth experienced, the plug-in electric car segment represented just about 1 out of every 250 vehicles (0.4%) on the world's roads by the end of 2018.

China

The People's Republic of China had 322 million motor vehicles in use at the end of September 2018, of which, 235 million were passenger cars in 2018, making China the country with largest motor vehicle fleet in the world. In 2016, the motor vehicle fleet consisted of 165.6 million cars and 28.4 million trucks and buses. About  13.6 million vehicles were sold in 2009, and motor vehicle registrations in 2010 increased to more than 16.8 million units, representing nearly half the world's fleet increase in 2010. Ownership per capita rose from 26.6 vehicles per 1000 people in 2006 to 141.2 in 2016.

The stock of highway-legal plug-in electric or new energy vehicles in China totaled 2.21 million units by the end of September 2018, of which, 81% are all-electric vehicles. These figures include heavy-duty commercial vehicles such buses and sanitation trucks, which represent about 11% of the total stock. China is also the world's largest electric bus market, reaching about 385,000 units by the end of 2017.

The number of cars and motorcycles in China increased 20 times between 2000 and 2010. This explosive growth has allowed China to become the world's largest new car market, overtaking the US in 2009. Nevertheless, ownership per capita is 58 vehicles per 1000 people, or a ratio of 1:17.2 vehicles to people, still well below the rate of motorization of developed countries.

United States

The United States has the second largest fleet of motor vehicles in the world after China. , had a motor vehicles stock of 259.14 million, of which, 246 million were light duty vehicles, consisting of 112.96 million passenger cars and 133 million light trucks (includes SUVs). A total of 11.5 million heavy trucks were registered at the end 2016 Vehicle ownership per capita in the U.S. is also the highest in the world, the U.S. Department of Energy (USDoE) reports a motorization rate of 831.9 vehicles in operation per 1000 people in 2016, or a ratio of 1:1.2 vehicles to people.

According to USDoE, the rate of motorization peaked in 2007 at 844.5 vehicles per 1000 people. In terms of licensed drivers, as of 2009 the country had 1.0 vehicle for every licensed driver, and 1.87 vehicles per household.  Passenger car registrations in the United States declined -11.5% in 2017 and -12.8% in 2018.

, the stock of alternative fuel vehicles in the United States included over 20 million flex-fuel cars and light trucks, the world's second largest flexible-fuel fleet in the world after Brazil. However, actual use of ethanol fuel is significantly limited due to the lack of E85 refueling infrastructure.

Regarding the electrified segment, the fleet of hybrid electric vehicles in the United States is the second largest in the world after Japan, with more than four million units sold through April 2016. Since the introduction of the Tesla Roadster electric car in 2008, cumulative sales of highway legal plug-in electric vehicles in the U.S. passed one million units in September 2018. The U.S. stock of plug-in vehicles is the second largest after China (2.21 million by September 2018).

, the country's fleet also includes more than 160,000 natural gas vehicles, mainly transit buses and delivery fleets. Despite its relative small size, natural gas use accounted for about 52% of all alternative fuels consumed by alternative transportation fuel vehicles in the U.S. in 2009.

In the US a motor vehicle is specifically defined as a contrivance used for commercial purposes. As defined in US Code
18 U.S.C. § 31 : US Code - Section 31: Definitions (6) Motor vehicle. - The term "motor vehicle" means every description of carriage or other contrivance propelled or drawn by mechanical power and used for commercial purposes on the highways in the transportation of passengers, passengers and property, or property or cargo.

Europe

The 27 European Union (EU-27) member countries had a fleet of over 256 million in 2008, and passenger cars accounted for 87% of the union's fleet. The five largest markets, Germany (17.7%), Italy (15.4%), France (13.3%), the UK (12.5%), and Spain (9.5%), accounted for 68% of the region's total registered fleet in 2008. The EU-27 member countries had in 2009 an estimated ownership rate of 473 passenger cars per 1000 people.

According to Ward's, Italy had the second highest (after the U.S.) vehicle ownership per capita in 2010, with 690 vehicles per 1000 people. Germany had a rate of motorization of 534 vehicles per 1000 people and the UK of 525 vehicles per 1000 people, both in 2008. France had a rate of 575 vehicles per 1000 people and Spain 608 vehicles per 1000 people in 2007. Portugal, between 1991 and 2002 grew up 220% on its motorization rate, having had in 2002, 560 cars per 1000 people.

Italy also leads in alternative fuel vehicles, with a fleet of 779,090 natural gas vehicles , the largest NGV fleet in Europe. Sweden, with 225,000 flexible-fuel vehicles, has the largest flexifuel fleet in Europe by mid-2011.

More than one million plug-in electric passenger cars and vans have been registered in Europe by June 2018, the world's second largest regional plug-in stock after China.

Norway is the leading plug-in market in Europe with almost 500,000 units registered . In October 2018, Norway became the world's first country where 10% of all passenger cars on the road are plug-in electrics. Also, the Norwegian plug-in car segment market share has been the highest in the world for several years, achieving 39.2% in 2017, 49.1% in 2018, and 74.7% in 2020.

Japan
Japan had 73.9 million vehicles by 2010, and had the world's second largest motor vehicle fleet until 2009. , the registered motor vehicle fleet totaled 75.81 million vehicles consisting of 61,40 million cars and 14,41 million trucks and buses. Japan has the largest hybrid electric vehicle fleet in the world. , there were 7.51 million hybrids registered in the country, excluding kei cars, and representing 19.0% of all passenger cars on the road.

Brazil

The Brazilian vehicle fleet reached 64.8 million vehicles in 2010, up from 29.5 million units in 2000, representing a 119% growth in ten years, and reaching a motorization rate of 340 vehicles per 1000 people. In 2010 Brazil experienced the second largest fleet increase in the world after China, with 2.5 million vehicle registrations.

, Brazil has the largest alternative fuel vehicle fleet in the world with about 40 million alternative fuel motor vehicles in the road. The clean vehicle stock includes 30.5 million flexible-fuel cars and light utility vehicles and over 6 million flex-fuel motorcycles by March 2018; between 2.4 and 3.0 million neat ethanol vehicles still in use, out of 5.7 million ethanol only light-vehicles produced since 1979; and, a total of 1.69 million natural gas vehicles.

In addition, all the Brazilian gasoline-powered fleet is designed to operate with high ethanol blends, up to 25% ethanol fuel (E25). The market share of flex fuel vehicles reached 88.6% of all light-duty vehicles registered in 2017.

India
India's vehicle fleet had the second-largest growth rate after China in 2010, with 8.9%. The fleet went from 19.1 million in 2009 to 20.8 million units in 2010. India's vehicle fleet has increased to 210 million in March 2015. India has a fleet of 1.1 million natural gas vehicles 
 .

Australia
As of January 2011, the Australian motor vehicle fleet had 16.4 million registered vehicles, with an ownership rate of 730 motor vehicles per 1000 people, up from 696 vehicles per 1000 residents in 2006. The motor vehicle fleet grew 14.5% since 2006, for an annual rate of 2.7% during this five-year period.

Comparison by regions
The following table compares vehicle ownership rates by region with the US, the country with the highest motorization rate in the world, and how it has evolved from 1999 to 2016.

Production by country
In 2017, a total of 97.3 million cars and commercial vehicles were built worldwide, led by China, with about 29 million motor vehicles manufactured, followed by the United States with 11.2 million, and Japan with 9.7 million. The following table shows the top 15 manufacturing countries for 2017 and their corresponding annual production between 2004 and 2017.

See also

Active mobility
Effects of the car on societies
Environmentally friendly vehicle
History of the automobile
List of countries by vehicles per capita
List of countries by motor vehicle production
List of countries by traffic-related death rate
List of motor vehicle awards
Motor vehicle emissions
Peak car use
Road traffic safety
Sustainable transport
Traffic congestion

References

External links